Grayson County High School may refer to either of the following United States high schools:
Grayson County High School (Kentucky) in Leitchfield, Kentucky
Grayson County High School (Virginia) in Independence, Virginia